Abdyl is a given name. Notable people with the name include:

 Abdyl Dylaveri, Albanian politician
 Abdyl Frashëri (1839–1892), Albanian diplomat
 Abdyl Këllezi (1919–1977), Albanian politician
 Abdyl Xhaja, Albanian government minister
 Abdyl Ypi (1876–1920), Albanian politician

See also
 Abdul